The Osborn Hotel is a building in southeast Portland, Oregon, listed on the National Register of Historic Places.

History 
A major fire severely damaged the building on August 8, 2014.

Doc Marie's, a lesbian bar, operates in the building as of 2022.

Further reading

See also
 National Register of Historic Places listings in Southeast Portland, Oregon

References

External links
 

1890 establishments in Oregon
Buckman, Portland, Oregon
Hotel buildings completed in 1890
Hotel buildings on the National Register of Historic Places in Portland, Oregon
Italianate architecture in Oregon
Portland Historic Landmarks